First-seeded Roger Federer was the defending champion, and won in the final 6–3, 6–4, against David Nalbandian.

Seeds

Draw

Finals

Top half

Bottom half

External links
 Draw
 Qualifying draw

Singles